Ernest Arthur Freeman  (1900–1975) was an English orthopaedic surgeon.

Freeman received his secondary education at Westminster City School. In the last few weeks of WWI, he was conscripted and served as a private in the Queen's Royal Regiment (West Surrey). With his ex-serviceman's grant he entered St Bartholomew's Hospital Medical School in 1919 as a student at the University of London. In 1925 he qualified MRCS, LRCP. In 1927 he graduated MB BS (Lond.) and qualified FRCS. At St Bartholomew's Hospital, after house appointments and serving as a junior demonstrator in pathology he joined George Gask's professorial unit as third assistant in a team comprising Thomas Peel Dunhill, Geoffrey Keynes, and James Paterson Ross.

Freeman's claim to fame rests upon the 1938 description of the eponymous Freeman–Sheldon syndrome. The foot deformities involved in two paediatric cases of the syndrome were brought to Freeman's attention for possible surgical correction. Freeman then consulted with Sheldon, who was an expert on diseases of bone.

In 1950 in Wolverhampton, Freeman married Joan Mary Fisher Horrell (1912–2006). Upon his death he was survived by his widow, a son, and a daughter.

Selected publications
wit E. A. Freeman:

References

1900 births
1975 deaths
People educated at Westminster City School
Alumni of the Medical College of St Bartholomew's Hospital
20th-century English medical doctors
British surgeons
Fellows of the Royal College of Surgeons
20th-century surgeons